Hiroshima (ひろしま) is a 1953 Japanese docudrama film directed by Hideo Sekigawa about the atomic bombing of Hiroshima and its impact. It tells the story of a group of teachers, their students, and their families in the years after the bomb. In a flashback sequence, tens of thousands of extras from Hiroshima, many of them survivors, helped recreate the "hellscape" immediately following the bombing.

The film was based on the eye-witness accounts of the bombing's child survivors compiled by Dr. Arata Osada for the 1951 best-selling book Children Of The A Bomb: Testament Of The Boys And Girls Of Hiroshima (Genbaku no ko). Produced with the backing of the Japan Teachers Union, the film's "anti-American" stance and graphic content prevented it from gaining a wide release. It fell into obscurity, but has resurfaced in the late 2010s. Many of the cast and crew went on to play important roles in post-war Japanese cinema.

Summary 
Hiroshima opens in a classroom as students and a teacher listen to a radio broadcast detailing the August 6, 1945 detonation of a nuclear bomb on the city. A girl cries out, "Stop it! Stop it!", and her nose begins to bleed. She and a third of the class are revealed to be afflicted by leukemia, the "A-bomb disease."

The film shows how groups of people deal with the suffering brought about by the blast. Children are at the center of the narrative. Many are shown to have become "wayward scavengers" peddling souvenirs to tourists. Another, a school dropout, copes with his trauma by gambling. There's an emphasis on the discrimination leveled against the victims of the blast.

A flashback sequence depicts the city before the blast, the blast itself, and its immediate aftermath. After the bomb explodes, "combining documentary footage and staged recreations, Sekigawa presents a furnace of confusion, anguish, and overwhelming misery." The city turns into a "hellscape [that] is littered with ravaged bodies and buildings in ruin, forming abstract images of mangled limbs and structures, a fragmentary portrait of flames, destruction, tattered clothes, and bloodshed. The victims call out for loved ones, coworkers, and classmates, for anyone who has survived."

The film heavily criticizes the imperial Japanese military bureaucracy, depicting them as "foolishly one-dimensional, short-sighted, and devoid of a moral compass". For example, they continue demanding utmost loyalty to the Emperor even after the blast, surrounded by burning wreckage.

The American military is also implicated in the bombing. The very presence of American soldiers, shown at the Hiroshima Peace Memorial in the film, went against Japanese censors' efforts to remove any mentions of the American occupation in the war's aftermath and assert that the Japanese were "taking control of their new democratic destiny without the influence of the Allied Powers."

Cast 

 Yumeji Tsukioka, lead actress (and a native of Hiroshima)
 Eiji Okada, lead actor
 Yoshi Katô
Isuzu Yamada
Yasuaki Takano
Masayuki Tsukida

Production 
The Japan Teachers Union (JTU) commissioned Hiroshima-born director Kaneto Shindō to make a film adaptation of the book Children Of The A Bomb to confront the bombing and its aftermath. Having been partly motivated by teachers' collective guilt at having promoted imperialistic dogma encouraging students to die for their country, the JTU was keen to confront the subject in cinema. Shindō directed Children of Hiroshima (1952), which was relatively successful in Japan and premiered internationally at the 1953 Cannes Film Festival. The JTU, however, was unhappy with the film. They claimed that Shindō had "made [the story] into a tear-jerker and destroyed its political orientation" as it doesn't mention the cause of the war or condemn those who dropped it. So, they immediately funded another adaption of Children Of The A Bomb, this time turning to the communist-leaning Hideo Sekigawa.

The film's production was a collaboration with the residents of Hiroshima. Survivors of the bombing, labor union members, and other residents of the city comprised the large number of extras used in the film numbered up to 90,000. Their presence helped recreate the sense of mass confusion in the scenes of the bombing's aftermath. Some even lent their bowls and other possessions from the blast as props for the film; the crew themselves also "worked tirelessly to collect rubble and rags for the film's production". City officials and local businesses also lent their full support.

Hiroshima-born lead actress Yumeji Tsukioka appealed to the production company with whom she was under contract, Shochiku, to let her act in the film without payment. She stated that she wanted to "contribute to society and help deter 'largescale wars.'"

The "somber, compelling" score of the film was composed by Akira Ifukube, who would go on to compose for 1954's "nuclear-themed" Godzilla.

Release 
The film was critically well-received upon release, but only had a limited theater run. It languished in obscurity for decades, but enjoyed a revival in the late 2010s.

Its producers and distributors differed on whether to cut scenes, and the film did not end up getting a wider release. The film's backers first sought distribution by the major studios. Allegedly, Shochiku demanded cuts, judging the film too "anti-American" and "cruel", and stalled the release process. Reportedly, all five major studios refused to release the film after that. The JTU ended up self-distributing the film, but the release was limited. They held screenings in schools and community centers, despite the Ministry of Education, Science, Sports and Culture considering it too “anti-American” to show to students. The film was financially successful.  Sekigawa's communist politics and his subsequent foray into less "high-brow" cinema contributed to the film's obscurity in subsequent decades.

In 1955, Hiroshima was released in an edited version in the United States. It was the first time many Americans had been able to see images of the effects of the bomb.  In 1984, JTU hired a Tokyo-based company to distribute the film and it released a DVD in 2005.

Ippei Kobayashi, the son of the film's assistant director Taihei Kobayashi, had tried to get the film re-screened in public, but was unable to do so before he died. However, he did start showing it independently in 2008 and enlisted student volunteers from Ritsumeikan University to translate the dialogue into English. His son, movie producer Kai Kobayashi, continued the revival project in the late 2010s. He had the film newly digitized in 2017 and had it screened in Kyoto and Hiroshima in 2019. The film streamed on FilmStruck in 2018 and came out as a Blu-ray by Arrow Films in 2020.

Legacy 
Many of the cast and crew had successful careers in post-war Japanese cinema.

Isuzu Yamada later played a role inspired by Lady Macbeth in the Akira Kurosawa adaptation Throne of Blood (1957), and several other Kurosawa films. The film's composer Akira Ifukube went on to compose for "nuclear-themed" Godzilla (1954) and a host of subsequent films in the franchise. Cinematographer Yoshio Miyajima later shot Masaki Kobayashi’s films Harakiri and Kwaidan.

Alain Resnais's French film Hiroshima mon amour (1959) starred this film's lead actor, Eiji Okada, and incorporated a few shots from the film. Okada later appeared in the Japanese New Wave film Woman in the Dunes (1964).

References 

1950s Japanese films
1953 war films
1953 drama films
1953 films
Docudrama films
Films about the atomic bombings of Hiroshima and Nagasaki
Films set in Hiroshima
Films shot in Hiroshima
Japanese avant-garde and experimental films
Films scored by Akira Ifukube
Japanese black-and-white films
Japanese war films
Japanese World War II films
1950s Japanese-language films
Works about children in war